Elections to Moyle District Council were held on 21 May 1997 on the same day as the other Northern Irish local government elections. The election used three district electoral areas to elect a total of 15 councillors.

Election results

Note: "Votes" are the first preference votes.

Districts summary

|- class="unsortable" align="centre"
!rowspan=2 align="left"|Ward
! % 
!Cllrs
! % 
!Cllrs
! %
!Cllrs
! %
!Cllrs
! % 
!Cllrs
!rowspan=2|TotalCllrs
|- class="unsortable" align="center"
!colspan=2 bgcolor="" | SDLP
!colspan=2 bgcolor="" | DUP
!colspan=2 bgcolor="" | UUP
!colspan=2 bgcolor="" | Sinn Féin
!colspan=2 bgcolor="white"| Others
|-
|align="left"|Ballycastle
|25.3
|1
|19.4
|1
|14.8
|1
|0.0
|0
|bgcolor="#DDDDDD"|40.5
|bgcolor="#DDDDDD"|2
|5
|-
|align="left"|Giant's Causeway
|0.0
|0
|bgcolor="#D46A4C"|36.2
|bgcolor="#D46A4C"|2
|33.7
|2
|0.0
|0
|30.1
|1
|5
|-
|align="left"|The Glens
|35.5
|2
|8.8
|0
|0.0
|0
|18.2
|1
|bgcolor="#CDFFAB"|37.5
|bgcolor="#CDFFAB"|2
|5
|-'
|-
|- class="unsortable" class="sortbottom" style="background:#C9C9C9"
|align="left"| Total
|22.5
|3
|19.7
|3
|14.0
|3
|7.5
|1
|36.3
|5
|15
|-
|}

Districts results

Ballycastle

1993: 2 x Independent, 1 x SDLP, 1 x DUP, 1 x UUP
1997: 2 x Independent, 1 x SDLP, 1 x DUP, 1 x UUP
1993-1997 Change: No change

Giant's Causeway

1993: 2 x Independent Unionist, 2 x DUP, 1 x UUP
1997: 2 x DUP, 2 x UUP, 1 x Independent Unionist
1993-1997 Change: Independent Unionist joins UUP

The Glens

1993: 2 x SDLP, 1 x Sinn Féin, 1 x Independent Republican, 1 x Independent Nationalist
1997: 2 x SDLP, 1 x Sinn Féin, 1 x Independent Republican, 1 x Independent Nationalist
1993-1997 Change: No change

References

Moyle District Council elections
Moyle